This list of Church in Wales churches is arranged by dedication. For a list arranged according to the structures of the Church in Wales, please see the pages for the individual dioceses. For a list arranged by geographical location, please see the lists of churches in each Welsh principal area.

List of churches

References